Cotton Cay is an uninhabited island located in the Turks and Caicos Islands, about  northeast of Salt Cay.

The island is oblong in shape, generally of low elevation, and has a low density coastal vegetation. Plantation ruins and field walls can be seen on the western half of the island, indicating that cotton and sisal were once raised here. Echinocactus horizonthalonius (Turk's Head cactuses), which are uncommon on the main islands in the country, are well-established on Cotton Cay.

References 

Turks Islands